Stivers School for the Arts is a magnet school in the Dayton City Schools in Dayton, Ohio, USA, in the St. Anne's Hill Historic District neighborhood. It is a public middle and high school that focuses on education in the visual and performing arts. U.S. News & World Report consistently ranks Stivers among America's best high schools.

History
Stivers Manual Training High School was built in 1908 at 1313 East 5th Street in Dayton. It was designed by renowned Dayton architect Charles Insco Williams. The original building is Dayton Publics oldest operating school.

It was Stivers High School until 1974 when it merged with Patterson Co-op High School and then in the mid-1980s it became a middle school. The last class to graduate as Stivers High School was 1976.  It became both a middle and high school in the mid-1990s, graduating its first (new) high school class in 2000.

Renovation
Stivers was renovated and the students went temporarily to the Homewood Campus. The current Stivers reopened on October 29, 2008. The class of 2008 was the first class to graduate from the renovated building. Students enter Stivers at the 7th grade level by audition and may stay until they graduate in 12th grade. The school currently has around 920 students in grades 7-12.

Programs
Stivers offers programs in piano, band, orchestra, dance, theatre, creative writing, choir, and visual arts as well as a full range of quality academics. Special features of the Arts programs include weekly, individualized instruction, special seminars, master classes and extensive opportunities for performance and creative expression. Students are provided instruction through one-on-one contact with many of the community's leading professional and performing artists.

Art themes are integrated into the general curriculum.

Milton Caniff is a famous Stivers alumnus. He was a cartoonist and at times in his cartoons referenced a high school called St. Ivers, a reference to his alma mater. Stivers honored Caniff's legacy by renaming part of South Clinton Street (adjacent to Fifth St.) "Milton Caniff Drive".

Curriculum and activities

 Academic: Required and elective college preparatory courses including Advanced Placement Courses
 Athletic and a number of enrichment programs designed to integrate the abilities of the well-rounded student. Such activities include: Freshman, JV Boys and Girls Basketball, Varsity Boys and Girls Basketball, Varsity Girls Volleyball, Varsity Golf, Varsity Cross-country Varsity Boys and Girls Soccer, Cheerleading, Varsity Swimming, Varsity Wrestling, Pep Squad, Track and field, Girls and Boys Tennis, JCOWA (Junior Council on World Affairs), Debate Club, Math Olympics, Yearbook Committee, Newspaper, Muse Machine
Foreign language offerings include Spanish and French. They are available for all students.
 Honors and advanced placement opportunities are available in: English, Mathematics, Foreign Language, Levels III & IV of all eight art magnets. Advanced placement courses available are: AP Literature, AP Language, AP Calculus, AP Biology, AP Chemistry, AP European History, AP U.S. History, AP Government, AP Spanish Language, AP Music Theory, AP World History, AP Human Geography, AP Environmental Science

Courses in arts magnet areas include:

Visual Arts - Drawing, Painting, Animation, Sculpting, Computer Graphics, Photography, Printmaking and Ceramics
Creative Writing - Beginning through advanced classes, journalism, film appreciation,
Orchestra - Beginning through advanced classes
Band - Beginning through advanced classes, Jazz Band
Dance - Beginning through advanced classes in Ballet, Jazz, and Modern dance
Theatre - Beginning through advanced classes in Acting, Technical Theatre
Choral Music - General Choir, Show Choir, and other specialized choral groups
Piano- Beginning through advanced piano classes, music theory, musicianship

seedling Foundation
The seedling Foundation is a non-profit organization established to benefit Stivers School for the Arts. The foundation's purpose is to support the Arts Programs at Stivers by providing funds for guest artists, scholarship programs, and other educational pursuits. The organization consists of parents, alumni, and community leaders. Donations are accepted by the seedling Foundation for the current capital campaign.

Recognitions
 Honored by U.S. News & World Report as being among America's best public high schools, earning Silver Medal in 2015.
The highly-decorated Stivers Jazz Orchestra won the national championships at Berklee College of Music High School Jazz Festival in 2004, 2008, and 2011.

Ohio High School Athletic Association State Championships

 Boys Basketball - 1924,1928,1929,1930,
 Girls Track and Field – 1976

Notable alumni
 Milton Caniff, cartoonist
 Bobby Colburn, former professional basketball player
 Chuck Grigsby, former professional basketball player
 Marj Heyduck, Dayton Daily News columnist
 Bill Hosket Sr., former professional basketball player
David Tendlar, animator
 Toccara Jones, model
 Frankie Sanders, former professional basketball player
 Frank Stanton, former president and vice chairman of CBS
 Brandon Patrick George, flutist
 Garry Cooper, Co-founder and CEO or Rheaply

Notable faculty
 Roz Young, Dayton Daily News columnist

References

External links
 Renovation renderings per Architect's site

Middle schools in Montgomery County, Ohio
National Register of Historic Places in Montgomery County, Ohio
Art schools in Ohio
School buildings on the National Register of Historic Places in Ohio
Educational institutions established in 1908
High schools in Dayton, Ohio
Public high schools in Ohio
Public middle schools in Ohio
Magnet schools in Ohio
1908 establishments in Ohio